Circuit Paul Armagnac also known as Circuit de Nogaro is a motorsport race track located in the commune of Nogaro in the Gers department in southwestern France. The track is named in honor of Nogaro-born racing driver Paul Armagnac who died in an accident during practice for the 1962 1000 km de Paris at the Montlhéry circuit.

History

Motorsports racing events in Nogaro were first organized when racing driver Paul Armagnac and Robert Castagnon created the Association Sportive Automobile de l'Armagnac. In 1953 the Rallye de l'Armagnac was held on a street circuit using public roads around Nogaro. Public safety concerns after the 1955 Le Mans disaster caused the number of road racing events on public roads in Europe to decrease. Plans were made to create a permanent race circuit and construction began in 1959 at a site near the Nogaro airport.

The race circuit opened on 3 October 1960 as the first purpose-built race circuit in France. The first race held at the new circuit was the Nogaro Grand Prix for Formula Junior cars, won by Bruno Basini.

The venue hosted Formula Two championship races from 1975 to 1978. It also hosted the French motorcycle Grand Prix in 1978 and 1982. The Nogaro circuit also hosted the European Touring Car Championship from 1985 to 1988.

Track description
The track is relatively flat, with  difference in elevation between its highest and lowest points. The aerodrome straight passes alongside the neighbouring Nogaro Aerodrome.

Events
Events hosted by the circuit have included:

 Current

 April: FFSA GT Championship Coupes de Pâques de Nogaro, Alpine Elf Europa Cup, French F4 Championship, Renault Clio Cup France, Renault Clio Cup Spain
 June: Grand Prix Camions de Nogaro

 Former

 Blancpain Sprint Series (2013–2015)
 BPR Global GT Series (1995–1996)
 British Formula One Championship (1979)
 European Eco-Marathon Competition (2000–2009)
 European Formula Two Championship (1975–1978)
 European Touring Car Championship (1985–1988)
 European Truck Racing Championship (1994–2016)
 F4 Spanish Championship (2017)
 FIA European Formula 3 Championship (1982–1984)
 FIA GT Championship (2007–2008)
 FIA GT1 World Championship (2012)
 FIA Sportscar Championship 2003 FIA Sportscar Championship Nogaro (2003)
 Formula 3 Euro Series (2007)
 Formula 750 (1976, 1979)
 French Formula Three Championship (1964–1973, 1980–2002)
 French Formula Renault Championship (1971–2009)
 French Supertouring Championship (1976–2005)
 Grand Prix motorcycle racing French motorcycle Grand Prix (1978, 1982)
 International Formula 3000 Grand Prix de Nogaro (1990–1993)
 NASCAR Whelen Euro Series (2009–2013)
 Sidecar World Championship (1978)

Lap records

The official lap record for the current Grand Prix circuit layout is 1:20.160, set by Alessandro Zanardi during the 1991 Nogaro F3000 round, while the unofficial all-time track record is 1:17.342, set by Franck Lagorce in the qualifying of 1993 Nogaro F3000 round. The official fastest race lap records at the Circuit Paul Armagnac are listed as:

Notes

References

External links

Paul
Paul
Sports venues in Gers
Sports venues completed in 1960